This article lists the characters that appear in the Japanese CGI, Ga-Ra-Ku-Ta: Mr. Stain on Junk Alley , containing fourteen volumes and created by Ryuji Masuda.

Characters

References

Mr Stain